Epidendrum apaganoides (resembles E. apaganum) is a species of orchid in the genus Epidendrum.

apaganoides